"Bye Bye" (バイバイ) is the 19th single from Japanese singer Ai Otsuka, and the fourth single to be released from her Love Letter album. It is her second re-cut single, and it will be the CM song for the Asahi Breweries LTD new low-alcohol beverage, Asahi Slat.

Track listing

Charts

Oricon Sales Chart (Japan)

References

Ai Otsuka songs
2009 singles
Songs written by Ai Otsuka
2009 songs
Avex Trax singles